Pallard the Punter is a 1919 British silent sports crime film directed by J.L.V. Leigh and starring Jack Leigh, Heather Thatcher and Lionel d'Aragon. It was based on the 1913 novel Grey Timothy by Edgar Wallace, set in the world of horse racing. It was made by British Gaumont at Lime Grove Studios in Shepherd's Bush.

Cast
 Jack Leigh as Brian Pallard
 Heather Thatcher as Gladys Callender
 Lionel d'Aragon as Lord Pinlow
 Cecil Morton York as Peter Callender
 Cyril Smith as Horace Callender

References

Bibliography
 Warren, Patricia. British Film Studios: An Illustrated History. Batsford, 2001.

External links

1919 films
1910s sports films
British crime films
British silent feature films
Films based on works by Edgar Wallace
Films shot at Lime Grove Studios
British horse racing films
British black-and-white films
1919 crime films
1910s English-language films
1910s British films
Silent sports films